Gossi  is a town and rural commune in the Cercle of Gourma-Rharous of the Tombouctou Region of Mali, lying northeast of Hombori and southwest of Gao. The town is just to the west of the main RN15 highway that links Mopti with Gao. It is on a seasonal lake, Mare de Gossi, and is surrounded by nature reserves in which a large herd of elephants live. The town is the site of a large cattle market. The commune contains around 31 villages and in the 2009 census, it had a population of 24,521. Most of the population are nomadic pastoralists but there are permanent settlements around Lake Gossi, Lake Ebanguemalène and Lake Agoufou.

On 24 July 2014, a McDonnell Douglas MD-83 aircraft flying Air Algérie Flight 5017 crashed southeast of Gossi with 116 people on board. The flight had left Ouagadougou and was headed to Algiers.  Initial reports suggested a sandstorm might have been to blame. Gossi was also the site of the capture of Mimi Ould Baba Ould El Mokhtar, believed to be responsible for a terrorist attack in Grand-Bassam, by French military forces.

References

External links
.

Communes of Tombouctou Region